Tsiu Hang is a village in the Sha Tau Kok area of North District of Hong Kong.

Administration
Tsiu Hang is one of the villages represented within the Sha Tau Kok District Rural Committee. For electoral purposes, Tsiu Hang is part of the Sha Ta constituency, which is currently represented by Ko Wai-kei.

References

External links
 Delineation of area of existing village Muk Min Tau and Tsiu Hang (Sha Tau Kok) for election of resident representative (2019 to 2022)

Villages in North District, Hong Kong
Sha Tau Kok